Nate Mooney (born January 26, 1972) is an American actor best known for his recurring role as Ryan McPoyle on the FX comedy series It's Always Sunny in Philadelphia.

Career
He appeared on various television series, including Breakout Kings, Grey's Anatomy, Nip/Tuck, and others. He played the role of Lurvy in the film Charlotte's Web.

Mooney gained his popularity by playing the role of Ryan McPoyle, the brother of Liam McPoyle and Margaret McPoyle, on the FXX showIt's Always Sunny in Philadelphia. Ryan is a comedic dimwit and is often rebuked for making dumb comments to his brother, such as offering to split a large sum of money (or clams) fifty-fifty-fifty to accommodate three people.

He also has a small part in one episode of Breaking Bad's third season as an arms dealer who sells bulletproof vests to the cousins attempting to murder Hank. During the buy they shoot him in the vest he is wearing to test their viability, and he survives.

He plays a lead role as Deputy Leon Drinkwater in IFC’s Stan Against Evil.

Filmography

Film

Television

References

External links

Living people
Male actors from Wisconsin
Iowa State University alumni
Year of birth missing (living people)